Miren Ibarguren Agudo (born 23 May 1980) is a Spanish actress mostly known for her comedy roles.

Biography 
Miren Ibarguren Agudo was born on 23 May 1980 in San Sebastián, Gipuzkoa. She started in the Euskal Telebista soap opera Goenkale. She made her feature film debut with the role of JSU member Joaquina López in the 2007 period drama 13 Roses. She is very popular because of her roles in comedy television series such as Escenas de Matrimonio and Aída.

Since 2013 she has been dating Alberto Caballero.

Filmography

Movies

Television

Theatre

Accolades

References

External links 

1980 births
Living people
Actresses from the Basque Country (autonomous community)
Spanish film actresses
Spanish television actresses
People from San Sebastián
21st-century Spanish actresses
Basque-language actors